Adranes is a genus of ant-loving beetles in the family Staphylinidae. There are about six described species in Adranes.

Species
These six species belong to the genus Adranes:
 Adranes angustus Casey, 1924
 Adranes coecus LeConte, 1849
 Adranes dietzi Schaeffer, 1906
 Adranes lecontei Brendel, 1865
 Adranes pacificus Wickham, 1901
 Adranes taylori Wickham, 1901

References

Further reading

 
 

Clavigeritae
Articles created by Qbugbot